Adam Woźnica (born 9 May 1994) is a Polish volleyball player, playing in position middle blocker.

Sporting achievements

Clubs 
Youth Polish Championship:
  2011
Junior Polish Championship:
  2012, 2013

References

External links
 PlusLiga profile
 Volleybox profile
 TransferFever profile

1994 births
Living people
Polish men's volleyball players